Principled reasoning (also known as principles-based reasoning and principle-centered reasoning) is an alternative to modern portfolio theory based on a different conception of risk.

Concept
Modern portfolio theory, according to its founder, Harry Markowitz, equates risk with "variance of returns." Principled reasoning offers a critique of modern portfolio theory and its related departure from classical economics in evaluating markets in isolation from production and consumption. Principled reasoning holds that risk is partly a function of failure to adhere to foundational principles of national prosperity in the country of domicile of the investment.

Foundational principles
Principled reasoning contrasts with modern portfolio theory's Humean skepticism, drawing instead on the Sermon on the Mount. Principled reasoning holds that a community which honors the proper cultural, legal, and economic principles is like a house built on rock, which puts it at an inherently lower level of risk, while a community which does not honor the proper principles is like a house built on a foundation of sand, and is at inherently higher risk. The risks associated with lack of principle adherence are not, according to principled reasoning, necessarily or even usually manifested in the short run, but may take long periods of time to manifest in visible form.

Principle reasoning is associated with the economist Jerry Bowyer, investment strategist Vince Birley, and theologian Ken Boa, who presented the idea at the annual conference of Kingdom Advisors and collaborated on a book on the subject.

References

Financial economics
Finance theories
Investment
Portfolio theories
Financial risk